"Army of Me" is a song recorded by American singer-songwriter Christina Aguilera for her seventh studio album, Lotus (2012). It was co-written by Aguilera with Jamie Hartman, David Glass and Phil Bentley, with production done by Hartman and Tracklacers. Described by Aguilera as part two to her 2003 single "Fighter", she decided to record the song so that her newer, younger fans would have an empowering song to listen in case they were unfamiliar with her previous work. The song combines dance-pop and Eurodance genres; its instrumentation incorporates drum beats and rock guitars. "Army of Me" garnered mixed reviews from music critics. Many praised Aguilera's strong delivery of the song's message and branded it a potential single, while others criticized it for being too similar to "Fighter". Upon the release of Lotus, the song debuted on the South Korea international singles chart at number 103 with digital download sales of 2,689. Aguilera has performed the song at the 40th American Music Awards in the United States.

Background and recording
Following the release of her sixth studio album, Bionic (2010), Aguilera filed for divorce from her husband Jordan Bratman, starred in the film Burlesque, and recorded the accompanying soundtrack. She then became a coach on NBC's singing competition show The Voice and appeared as a featured artist on Maroon 5's single "Moves like Jagger" (2011), which spent four weeks atop the US Billboard Hot 100 chart. Following these events, Aguilera announced that had plans to begin production of her seventh album, stating that she wanted high quality and "personal" songs for the record. Regarding the creative direction, she revealed that the album would be a "culmination of everything I've experienced up until this point ... I've been through a lot since the release of my last album, being on ('The Voice'), having had a divorce ... This is all sort of a free rebirth for me." She further said "I'm embracing many different things, but it's all feel-good, super-expressive [and] super-vulnerable." Aguilera continued to say that the album would be about "self–expression and freedom" because of the personal struggles she had overcome during the last couple of years. Speaking about her new material during an interview on The Tonight Show with Jay Leno in 2012, Aguilera said that the recording process for Lotus was taking a while because "I don't like to just get songs from producers. I like them to come from a personal place ... I'm very excited. It's fun, exciting, introspective, it's going to be great".

Recorded at Henson Recording Studios, Hollywood, California, and Radley Studios, Los Angeles, California, by Justin Stanley, "Army of Me" was co-written by Aguilera with Jamie Hartman, David Glass and Phil Bentley. It was produced by Tracklacers and it was co-produced by Hartman. Aguilera's vocals were recorded by Oscar Ramirez at The Red Lips Room in Beverly Hills in California. Programming was carried out by Steve Daly and John Keep, while strings were composed by Hartman. In an interview with Andrew Hampp for Billboard, Aguilera explained how her role on The Voice has allowed her to reach a new generational audience who may not be familiar with her past work, including songs such as her 2002 single, "Fighter". When asked if some of the songs on Lotus feature themes which are similar to that of her 2002 album, Stripped, Aguilera responded by saying that "Army of Me" is what she describes as "Fighter 2.0".

Absolutely. There's a song called 'Army of Me,' which is sort of a 'Fighter 2.0.' There is a new generation of fans from a younger demographic that might not have been with me all the way but that watch me on the show now. I feel like every generation should be able to enjoy and have their piece of 'Fighter' within. This time, the way it musically came together it just felt right for this time and this generation. There's always going to be a fighter in me getting through some obstacle and some hurdle. All these 6-year-olds who know me from pushing my button and turning around in a big red chair who weren't around for the actual 'Fighter,' this is my chance to recharge it, rejuvenate it and do something modernized for them.

In her 2012 interview with The Advocate'''s Diane Anderson-Minshall Aguilera said that "Army of Me" is a song about "people that are maybe misunderstood or don’t fit into the norm but deserve a voice", and added that it is dedicated to them.

Composition and lyrics

Instrumentation consists of a "pounding" drum beat and "rocky" guitars. Aguilera presents herself as a fighter and tells her ex-boyfriend that she is stronger than he is in the lyrics "So how does it feel to know that I beat you?/ That I can defeat you?" Although Aguilera is heartbroken by the decision to split up with her ex-boyfriend, she is not a broken person. The lyrics "One of me is wiser/ One of me is stronger/ One of me's a fighter/ And there's a thousand faces of me/ We're gonna rise up for every time you broke me/ You're gonna face an army of me" are similar to those performed by Aguilera on "Fighter", although of "Army of Me" does not sample any of the song. Aguilera sings "Now that I'm wiser/ Now that I'm stronger/ Now that I'm a fighter/ There's a thousand faces on me" over a "thumping" beat, and belts the line "We're gonna rise up for every time you broke me" on the chorus. In 2015, the song was covered by recording artist Anastacia for her compilation album Ultimate Collection.

Critical reception
"Army of Me" garnered mixed reviews from music critics. Diane Anderson-Minshall of Pride Media noted that the song "makes a great LGBT anthem." Andrew Hampp for Billboard and Chris Younie for 4Music both thought that "Army of Me" could have been a potential single, the latter of whom writing "This track must be a future single." Younie continued to write that the song "captivates and excites right from the very start", has a "euphoric" energy and is the type of "angry" pop song that Kelly Clarkson "would give her right arm for". Sarah Rodman of The Boston Globe described it as a "Gloria Gaynor-meets-Depeche Mode dance of anger." Mike Wass for Idolator wrote that although "Army of Me" is a "quality" song, it is an album filler. Writing that it sounds as though it would have been a good song to include on her previous studio album, Bionic, Wass thought that Aguilera was "not exaggerating" when she refers to it as "Fighter 2.0". He concluded his review by saying that although her vocals are sparse, it is a "quirky" addition to Lotus. The A.V. Clubs Annie Zaleski described Aguilera as a "playful" and "sassy techno diva" on "Army of Me".

Kitty Empire of The Observer also thought that it shares similarities with "Fighter". She cited the Björk song of the same name as another influence, due to its "emotional territory" Robert Copsey for Digital Spy described the song as "nothing we haven't heard from her before, but there's an urgency to it that suggests Christina needed to get it out of her system", while Matthew Horton of Virgin Media wrote that Aguilera sounds as though she is declaring war. Michael Gallucci for PopCrush was critical of the song, writing that it sounds like a Cher disco song which features Aguilera "overworking" her vocal cords. Melissa Maerz of Entertainment Weekly found the song's lyrics to be defensive and bitter. Responding to the lyrics "And we're gonna rise up.../ For every time you wronged me/ Well, you're gonna face an army, army of me.' Maerz writes "Rise up against whom? Is the whole world really out to get her, or is this just an excuse to wear camouflage hot pants?"

Live performances

Aguilera performed "Let There Be Love" for the first time at the 40th American Music Awards on November 18, 2012, held at the Nokia Theatre in Los Angeles, California. Aguilera sang "Army of Me" as part of a medley with two other tracks from Lotus: "Lotus Intro" and "Let There Be Love". During an interview with MTV News, Aguilera revealed what the performance would be like and the creative direction behind it:

It's very exciting. It's definitely going to be a reflection of what Lotus means to me. If you take that album cover 
and give it a little performance twist, I'll bring that album cover to life, so it's going to be really fun. I can't give too much away about the songs, but it's definitely going to represent the album because the album is very multilayered. It doesn't represent 'Your Body' as a single tone. It has its ballads; and everything comes from a very sincere, deep–rooted place whether it's having fun or being vulnerable.

Bruna Nessif for E! Online described the performance as "interesting," and noted that the theme "to celebrate everyone for who they are" was similar to the moral content presented on Gaga's album Born This Way (2011). As Aguilera finished her set, she was joined on stage by Pitbull to perform his song "Feel This Moment", on which she is a featured artist.

Credits and personnel
Recording
Recorded at Henson Recording Studios, Hollywood, California; Radley Studios, Los Angeles, California.
String, Bass and Piano recorded at Henson Recording Studios, Hollywood, California.
Acoustic Guitars, Synth Piano and Synth Strings recorded at Radley Studios, Los Angeles, California.
Vocals recorded at The Red Lips Room, Beverly Hills, California.

Personnel

Songwriting – Christina Aguilera, Jamie Hartman, David Glass, Phil Bentley
Production – Tracklacers, Jamie Hartman (co-producer)
Vocal production – Christina Aguilera
Vocal recording – Oscar Ramirez
String arrangement – Jamie Hartman
String, Bass and Piano recording – Justin Stanley
Acoustic Guitars, Synth Piano and Synth Strings recording – Jamie Hartman
Assistant – Zivi Krieger

Drum programming, Keyboards and Synths – Steve Daly, Jon Keep
Synth Strings – Jamie Hartman, The Professor
Live Strings – Songa Lee, Rodney Wirtz, Alisha Bauer, Marisa Kuney
Live Piano – Jeff Babko, Jamie Hartman
Synth Piano – Jamie Hartman, The Professor
Live Bass – Tyler Chester, Steve Daly
Acoustic Guitars – Jamie Hartman

Credits adapted from the liner notes of Lotus, RCA Records.

Charts
Upon the release of Lotus, "Army of Me" debuted on the South Korean singles chart at number 103 during the week of November 11 to 17, 2012, due to digital download sales of 2,689.

Anastacia version

American recording artist Anastacia covered the song for her second greatest hits album Ultimate Collection'' (2015). The song was released as album's second single on 23 October 2015 by Sony Music Entertainment.

Track listings and formats
Digital Download

"Army of Me" – 3:25

Release history

Merwan Rim version
French singer-songwriter and artist Merwan Rim included a French version of the song, Tous Les Hommes En Un, on his debut album, L'échappée, released in 2012 by Mercury Records. His first performance and release of the song took place several months before Aguilera's.

References

2012 songs
Christina Aguilera songs
Anastacia songs
Songs written by Christina Aguilera
RCA Records singles
Sony Music singles
Songs written by Jamie Hartman
Eurodance songs